Qusheh Su (also Romanized as Qūsheh Sū) is a village in Golidagh Rural District, Golidagh District, Maraveh Tappeh County, Golestan Province, Iran. At the 2006 census, its population was 1,171, in 213 families.

References 

Populated places in Maraveh Tappeh County